Gonzalo Lencina (born 18 October 1997) is an Argentine professional footballer who plays as a forward for Atlético Bucaramanga, on loan from Belgrano.

Career
Lencina is a product of the Club Malvinas, Deportivo Norte and Belgrano youth systems. Diego Osella was the manager who gave Lencina his professional debut, he substituted the forward on during a Primera División loss to Racing Club on 16 March 2019; he featured for fourteen minutes at the Estadio Presidente Juan Domingo Perón.

On 5 October 2020, Lencina extended his contract with Belgrano until December 2023 and was immediately loaned out to fellow league club Gimnasia Jujuy until the end of 2021, with a purchase option. In January 2022, Lencina moved to Atlético de Rafaela, once again on a loan deal, until the end of 2022.

Personal life
In November 2018, Lencina was involved in a three-vehicle traffic collision on the Atilio López Highway in Alta Gracia. Despite one vehicle being totalled and some occupants needing fire department assistance after becoming trapped, no serious injuries occurred.

Career statistics
.

References

External links

1997 births
Living people
Sportspeople from Córdoba Province, Argentina
Argentine footballers
Association football forwards
Argentine Primera División players
Primera Nacional players
Club Atlético Belgrano footballers
Gimnasia y Esgrima de Jujuy footballers
Atlético de Rafaela footballers